Birger Nilsen (July 23, 1881 – June 1981) was an American gymnast. He competed in four events at the 1904 Summer Olympics.

References

External links
 

1881 births
1981 deaths
American male artistic gymnasts
Olympic gymnasts of the United States
Gymnasts at the 1904 Summer Olympics
People from Kragerø
Norwegian emigrants to the United States